Frontier Communications of Breezewood, LLC is a Frontier Communications operating company providing local telephone services to Breezewood, Pennsylvania. It also provides telephone service to Needmore, New Grenada, and Warfordsburg.

The company was founded in 1974. It was acquired by Rochester Telephone as it began to expand nationally. In 1994, Rochester Telephone changed its name to Frontier Corporation, and the local operating company became known as Frontier Communications of Breezewood, Inc. Global Crossing acquired Frontier in 1999, and Citizens Communications acquired Global Crossing's Frontier assets in 2001, and has owned it since.

The company was converted into an LLC in 2003.

References

See also
Global Crossing North America
List of Frontier Communications operating companies
Frontier Communications

Frontier Communications
Communications in Pennsylvania
Telecommunications companies established in 1974
1974 establishments in Pennsylvania
American companies established in 1974
Telecommunications companies of the United States